Craig Dolch (b. Nov. 11, 1958, Jacksonville, Florida) is an American sportswriter and broadcaster for radio and television. Dolch has written articles for many national and international publications, and has appeared numerous times on the Golf Channel.

Career 
Born in Florida, Dolch graduated from the University of Florida Journalism School in 1980.  In 1982, he started working for the Palm Beach Post.  Dolch covered professional golf, the Miami Dolphins and the Florida Gators.

In 2008, after taking a buyout from the Post, Dolch became a freelance journalist.  He has contributed sports articles to The New York Times, the London Times, Sports Illustrated, Golf World and USA TODAY. 

Dolch has appeared over 200 times on Golf Channel shows, including Viewer’s Forum and Grey Goose 19th Hole. He co-hosted a two-hour radio golf show, Golf Exchange, from 2011-1018. 

In 2011, Dolch wrote a book “Lost Tree” on the 50-year history of the North Palm Beach that is home to Jack Nicklaus.

Encephalitis Foundation 
In 2005, Dolch’s son, Eric, then 14, contracted encephalitis while Dolch was covering the U.S. Open at Pinehurst Country Club.  Eric spent a 115 days in a medically-induced coma at Nicklaus Children’s Hospital and was left severely disabled after a pair of 10-hour brain operations. 

In 2006, Dolch created the Eric Dolch Children’s Encephalitis Foundation, a non-profit that has raised more than $100,000 for special needs children and adults in South Florida.

Recognition 

 In 2014, Dolch was named Father of the Year by Golfweek. 
 In 2016, Dolch was inducted into the Palm Beach County Sports Hall of Fame. 
 In 2020, Dolch received the Steven C. Owen Award from the Indian River Golf Foundation.

References 

1958 births
Sportswriters from Florida
University of Florida alumni
Writers from Jacksonville, Florida
Living people
People from Palm Beach County, Florida